Christian Puggioni (born 17 January 1981) is an Italian former footballer who played as a goalkeeper.

Career
In January 2007, Puggioni joined Reggina.

On 2 July 2015, Puggioni signed with Sampdoria on a free transfer. He made his debut with Sampdoria on 22 October 2016, in a 2–1 home win against cross-city rivals Genoa, at the Stadio Luigi Ferraris.

On 28 November 2019, he joined Serie C club Vis Pesaro. In October 2020 he gave an interview in which he criticized Vis Pesaro's coaching and management team, after which the team issued an official statement of their position. His contract was set to expire in June 2021, but he was not released from the contract and continued to train individually, separately from the team. He never played another competitive game and retired at the end of the season.

References

1981 births
Living people
Footballers from Genoa
Italian footballers
Footballers from Sardinia
Association football goalkeepers
Reggina 1914 players
A.C. Perugia Calcio players
Pisa S.C. players
S.S.D. Varese Calcio players
Piacenza Calcio 1919 players
A.C. ChievoVerona players
U.C. Sampdoria players
Benevento Calcio players
Vis Pesaro dal 1898 players
Serie A players
Serie B players
Serie C players